Dinosaur Hunter or Dinosaur Hunters may refer to:

 Dennis the Menace: Dinosaur Hunter, a 1987 TV film.
 Dinosaur Hunters (documentary), a 1996 National Geographic documentary about the 1990s AMNH expeditions led in the Gobi Desert by paleontologists Mike Novacek and Mark Norell.
 Dinosaur Hunter (video game), a 1996 video game.
 Turok: Dinosaur Hunter, a 1997 video game.
 Turok: Dinosaur Hunter, a 1993 comic book series on which the video game was based.